The Clarisse House is the official residence of the Prime Minister of Mauritius at 37, Riverwalk Vacoas, Plaines Wilhems. It is frequently used for governmental conferences, summits and other official purposes, including the Prime Minister's New Year Speech. The current occupant of this house is the present Prime Minister, Pravind Jugnauth. The Prime Minister's Office is located at Port Louis.

History

The house was originally built by Edmond de Chazal, he named it after his wife (née Claire Rouillard) 'Clary House'.

See also
 State House - Official residence of the president
 List of prime ministers of Mauritius
 Spouse of the prime minister of Mauritius

References

Government buildings completed in 1860
Prime ministerial residences
Government buildings in Mauritius
Prime Ministers of Mauritius